Columbus Township is a civil township of Luce County in the U.S. state of Michigan. As of the 2020 census, the township population was 169.

Communities 
 Danaher is an unincorporated community at  just north of M-28 west of Newberry.
Laketon was a whistlestop on the Duluth, South Shore and Atlantic Railroad. A post office opened on March 11, 1902, with John M. Carr as its first postmaster. The office closed on May 15, 1913.
The community was settled along a railway line as early as 1881. McMillan has its own post office with the 49853 ZIP Code. The post office serves most of Columbus Township and small portions of several surrounding townships.

Geography

The source of the Tahquamenon River is within Columbus Township.

Major highways
  runs east–west though a southern portion of the township.

Demographics
As of the census of 2000, there were 215 people, 99 households, and 63 families residing in the township. The racial makeup of the township was 96.28% White, 1.40% Native American, and 2.33% from two or more races. Hispanic or Latino of any race were 0.47% of the population.

There were 99 households, out of which 21.2% had children under the age of 18 living with them, 54.5% were married couples living together, 2.0% had a female householder with no husband present, and 35.4% were non-families. 31.3% of all households were made up of individuals, and 12.1% had someone living alone who was 65 years of age or older. The average household size was 2.17 and the average family size was 2.72.

In the township the population was spread out, with 21.4% under the age of 18, 4.2% from 18 to 24, 23.3% from 25 to 44, 36.7% from 45 to 64, and 14.4% who were 65 years of age or older. The median age was 46 years. For every 100 females, there were 102.8 males. For every 100 females age 18 and over, there were 96.5 males.

The median income for a household in the township was $30,469, and the median income for a family was $33,750. Males had a median income of $32,813 versus $20,000 for females. The per capita income for the township was $18,289. About 8.3% of families and 12.9% of the population were below the poverty line, including 20.5% of those under the age of eighteen and 25.0% of those 65 or over.

References 

Townships in Luce County, Michigan
Townships in Michigan
Populated places established in 1887
1887 establishments in Michigan